Bam is a rural locality (a station) in Solnechny Selsoviet of Skovorodinsky District, Amur Oblast, Russia. The population was 876 as of 2018.

Geography 
Bam is located 36 km northwest of Skovorodino (the district's administrative centre) by road. Solnechny is the nearest rural locality.

References 

Rural localities in Skovorodinsky District